Best.Worst.Weekend.Ever. is a Netflix original television series. The limited series consists of eight episodes. It was released on October 19, 2018.

Cast
 Sam Ashe Arnold as Zed Novak
 Cole Sand as Argo Andropolis
 Brianna Reed as Treece Dombrowski
 Brittany Garms as Hallie, Treece's stepsister

Episodes

References

External links
 

2010s American teen sitcoms
2018 American television series debuts
2018 American television series endings
English-language Netflix original programming
Television shows about comics
Television series about teenagers